General elections were held in Trinidad and Tobago on 7 November 1966. The result was a victory for the People's National Movement, which won 24 of the 36 seats. Voter turnout was 65.8%.

Results

References

Trinidad
Elections in Trinidad and Tobago
1966 in Trinidad and Tobago